Weme is an unincorporated community in Clearwater County, in the U.S. state of Minnesota.

History
A post office was established at Weme in 1902, and remained in operation until it was discontinued in 1912. Hans Weme, the first postmaster, gave the community its name.

References

Unincorporated communities in Clearwater County, Minnesota
Unincorporated communities in Minnesota